The rural district of Market Harborough existed in Leicestershire, England, from 1894 to 1974.  It covered the area around Market Harborough, but not including the actual town.  It was greatly extended in 1935 by the abolition of Hallaton Rural District.  In 1974 under the Local Government Act 1972, it merged with Market Harborough urban district, Billesdon Rural District, Lutterworth Rural District to form the Harborough non-metropolitan district.

History of Leicestershire
Local government in Leicestershire
Districts of England created by the Local Government Act 1894
Districts of England abolished by the Local Government Act 1972
Rural districts of England
Harborough District